This is a list of singles which have reached number one on the Irish Singles Chart in 1980.

Hot Press magazine published fortnightly charts during the strike period. This information is now used by http://www.irishcharts.ie/. The number ones from this period (one every two weeks) were as follows...

 
NOTE: Although the official Irish charts recommenced on 5 October (week ending 4 October), the Irish charts website still lists the Hot Press chart for the 26 September - 9 October fortnight. This give the No.1 to be "Feels Like I'm in Love" by Kelly Marie, taking away the first two weeks of The Police's "Don't Stand So Close to Me". In reality, viewed from the variation on publication dates, this effectively gives Kelly Marie a two-day No.1 (26-27 September).
16 Number Ones
Most weeks at No.1 (song): "Take That Look Off Your Face" - Marti Webb, "What's Another Year" - Johnny Logan, "Xanadu" - Olivia Newton-John and Electric Light Orchestra (6 weeks)
Most weeks at No.1 (artist): Marti Webb, Johnny Logan, Olivia Newton-John and Electric Light Orchestra (6)
Most No.1s: Abba (2)

References

See also
1980 in music
Irish Singles Chart
List of artists who reached number one in Ireland

1980 in Irish music
1980 record charts
1980